CHQT (880 kHz, Global News Radio 880 Edmonton) is a commercial AM radio station licensed to Edmonton, Alberta. Owned by Corus Entertainment, the station broadcasts an all-news format.

CHQT broadcasts with a power of 50,000 watts, using a non-directional antenna in the daytime.  But because AM 880 is a clear channel frequency, CHQT must use a directional antenna at night.  Global News Radio 880 Edmonton can be heard in AM stereo using the C-QUAM system.

According to the Numeris Winter 2018-2019 Meter Ratings Report, the station ranks 18th (out of 19 stations measured)

As of February 28, 2021, CHQT is the 16th-most-listened-to radio station in the Edmonton market according to a PPM data report released by Numeris.

History 
The station signed on August 19, 1965 on 1110 kHz, with 10,000 watts power. It originally broadcast a Middle of the road format. In 1979, CHQT started using 50,000 watts power. In 1985, the station changed frequency to 880 kHz as it was sold to Monarch Broadcasting, Ltd.

In July 2000, Shaw Broadcasting sold the station to Corus Entertainment.  In June 2001, CHQT flipped to oldies as Cool 880. In October 2003, the station briefly flipped to a variety hits format as 880 Joe AM. The format moved to sister station CKNG-FM as 92.5 Joe FM on January 13, 2004, after which CHQT reverted to oldies; it is likely CHQT flipped to the format merely as a placeholder while CKNG prepared for their flip to avoid a rival company preemptively making any similar move.

On May 20, 2008, CHQT re-launched as an all-news station, branded as iNews 880, complementing sister talk radio station 630 CHED. On May 29, 2018, the station re-branded as Global News Radio 880 Edmonton, as part of an ongoing rebranding of Corus's news/talk radio stations to create synergies with Global News television programming, and its local station CITV-DT. As part of the rebranding, the station added an audio simulcast of Global News Hour at 6. An audio simulcast of Global News at Noon from Global Edmonton was added as of March 2019. As of July 2020, an audio-only rebroadcast of Global National airs on CHQT at 7 PM, following the News Hour simulcast.

References

External links
 Global News Radio 880 Edmonton
 History of CHQT - Canadian Communications Foundation
 

Hqt
Hqt
Hqt
Radio stations established in 1965
1965 establishments in Alberta